Qazi Kandi or Qazikandi may refer to:
 Qazikandi, Meyaneh, East Azerbaijan Province
 Qazi Kandi, Zanjan